Ibbu is a settlement in the Caprivi Strip of north-eastern Namibia.

References 

Populated places in the Zambezi Region